Admiral of France is a French title of honour. It is the naval equivalent of Marshal of France and was one of the Great Officers of the Crown of France.

History
The title was created in 1270 by Louis IX of France, during the Eighth Crusade. At the time, it was equivalent to the office of Constable of France. The Admiral was responsible for defending the coasts of Picardy, Normandy, Aunis, and Saintonge. In times of war, it was his responsibility to assemble French merchant ships into a navy. He had to arm, equip, and supply the ships for the course of the war, and give letters of marque to corsairs. In peacetime, he was responsible for the maintenance of the royal fleet (when one existed). He was also responsible for maritime commerce and the merchant fleet.

During the modern era, few admirals were sailors — moreover, with the exception of Claude d'Annebault, none of them actually commanded the fleet. It must be said that the actual power of the admiral was rather small, partly because of the creation of other admirals (the Admiral of the Levant for Provence, the Admiral of Brittany, and the Admiral of the West for Guyenne), and because of the creation of the General of the Galleys and the Secretary of State for the Navy.

The title, like the title of Constable, had much more political importance (which would eventually lead to the suppression of both titles). It was also a lucrative position: the admiral was allocated a part of the fines and confiscations imposed by the admiralty, and he had a right to unclaimed ships and shipwrecks as well as a tenth of the spoils taken in battle. He also had juridical rights, comparable to those exercised by the constable and the marshal. A second headquarters of the admiralty was established at Rouen, and about 50 other headquarters were set up at various other places around the coast of France. These tribunals judged cases dealing with fishing disputes and any crimes committed in the country's ports.

The Admiralty was suppressed in 1627 by Cardinal Richelieu, who had been named to the newly created post of Grand Master of Navigation and who wanted to bring all naval authority under one position. The position was recreated in 1669, but was now only an honorific title. The first new admiral was Louis, Count of Vermandois, who at the time was only 2 years old. Thereafter, only Louis Alexandre, Count of Toulouse involved himself in maritime affairs.

It was suppressed once more in 1791, restored in 1805 in the person of Marshal of France Joachim Murat. Currently, the most recent Admiral of France was François Thomas Tréhouart, in 1869.

This dignity remains fully valid today as a 2005 law article recalls: "The title of Marshal of France and that of Admiral of France, is a dignity in the state."

Admirals

 Florent de Varennes 1270 – First admiral of France
 Aubert II de Longueval, dead in naval combat in 1283 along the coasts of the Crown of Aragon
 Othon de Torcy : 1296–1297
 Mathieu IV of Montmorency : 1297–1304
 Rainier I of Monaco, Lord of Cagnes 1304–1314
 Hugues Quiéret 1335-1340
 Nicolas Béhuchet, 1338-1340
 Antonio Aithone Doria, 1339
 Robert de Houdetot, 1340
 Luis de la Cerda, prince of Fortunate Isles, 1341
 Charles I, Lord of Monaco, 1342
 Pierre Flotte de Revel, March 28, 1345–1347
 Jean de Nanteuil 1347–1356
 vacancy in the office 1356–1359
 Enguerran de Mentenay 1359
 Jean « Baudran » de la Heuse : 1359–1368
 François de Perilleux 1368–1369
 Aymeri VI, Viscount of Narbonne 1369–1373
 Jean de Vienne 1373–1396
 Renaud de Trie, lord of Sérifontaine 1397–1405 
 Pierre de Bréban, called Clignet 1405–1408
 Jacques de Châtillon, lord of Dampierre 1408–1415
 Robert de Bracquemont called Robinet : 1417–1418
 Jeannet de Poix : 1418
 Charles de Recourt, viscount of Beauvoir : 1418–1419
 Georges de Beauvoir de Chastellux : 1420
 Louis de Culant 1421–1437
 André de Laval-Montmorency, seigneur de Lohéac and baron de Retz  1437–1439
 Prégent VII de Coëtivy 1439–1450
 Jean V de Bueil de Montrésor 1450–1477
 Jean de Montauban : 8 of October, 1461–1466
 Louis de Bourbon, comte de Roussillon, bastard son of Charles I, Duke of Bourbon 1466–1486; legitimated 1463
 Charles II d'Amboise 1508–1511
 Louis Malet de Graville 1511–1516
 Guillaume Gouffier, seigneur de Bonnivet 1517–1525
 Philippe de Chabot seigneur de Brion (called Amiral de Brion), comte de Charni 1525–1543
 Claude d'Annebault 1543–1552
 Gaspard de Coligny, seigneur de Châtillon-sur-Loing 1552–1572
 Honorat II de Savoye, marquis de Villars 1572–1578
 Charles de Guise, duc de Mayenne 1578–1582
 Anne de Joyeuse 1582–1587
 Jean Louis de Nogaret de La Valette, duc d'Épernon 1587–1589
 Antoine de Brichanteau, marquis de Nangis 1589–1590
 Bernard de Nogaret de la Valette 1589–1592
 Charles de Gontaut, duc de Biron 1592–1594
 André de Brancas, marquis de Villars 1594–1595
 Charles de Montmorency-Damville, duc de Damville : 1596–1612
 Henri II de Montmorency 1612–1626

Period of grand masters of navigation :

 Cardinal Richelieu 1626–1642
 Jean Armand de Maillé-Brézé 1642–1646 
 Anne of Austria 1646–1650
 César, Duke of Vendôme 1651–1665

Restoration of title Admiral of France

 Louis, Count of Vermandois 1669–1683
 Louis Alexandre, Count of Toulouse 1683–1737
 Louis Jean Marie de Bourbon, Duke of Penthièvre 1737–1789
 Charles Hector d'Estaing : 1792
 Joachim Murat 1805–1814
 Louis-Antoine d’Artois, Duke of Angoulême : 1814–1830 
 Guy-Victor Duperré : 1830
 Laurent Truguet 1831 
 Albin Roussin 1840–1847
 Ange René Armand 1847–1854
 Charles Baudin 1854
 Ferdinand-Alphonse Hamelin 1854
 Alexandre Ferdinand Parseval-Deschenes December 2, 1854
 Armand Joseph Bruat 1855
 Joseph Romain-Desfossés 1860
 Charles Rigault de Genouilly 1864
 Léonard Charner 1864
 François Thomas Tréhouart 1869

English admirals 

Henry VI of England appointed two English aristocrats during the ministrations of Louis de Culant and André de Laval-Montmorency. Accordingly, they were not recognized by the Kingdom of France.

 William de la Pole, 1st Duke of Suffolk 1424–1437 (during the ministration of Louis de Culant)
 Edward de Courtenay : 1439 (during the ministration of André de Laval-Montmorency)

References

Sources
 B. Barbiche, Les institutions de la monarchie française à l'époque moderne, Presses universitaires de France, 1999.
 Musée national de Versailles Galeries historiques du Palais de Versailles, book 7, Imprimerie royale, 1842.
 Philippe Le Bas, France dictionnaire encyclopedique, tome 1, A-AZ, 1810.

 
History of the French Navy
Military ranks of France